Wedding soup or Italian wedding soup is an Italian soup consisting of green vegetables and meat. It is popular in the United States, where it is a staple in many Italian restaurants and diners.

Origin
The term wedding soup comes from a mistranslation of the Italian language phrase minestra maritata ('married soup'), which is a reference to the flavor produced by the combination or "marriage" of greens and the meat. The minestra maritata recipe is also prepared by the families of Lazio and Campania. Some form of minestra maritata was long popular in Toledo, Spain, before pasta became an affordable commodity to most Spaniards.

Ingredients
Wedding soup consists of green vegetables (usually endive and escarole or cabbage, lettuce, kale, and/or spinach) and meat (usually meatballs and/or sausage, the latter sometimes made of chicken and containing Italian parsley and parmesan cheese) in a clear chicken-based broth. Wedding soup sometimes contains pasta (usually cavatelli, fusilli, acini di pepe, pastina, orzo, etc.), lentils, carrots, or grated parmesan cheese.

See also
Hochzeitssuppe
 List of soups

References

External links

About.com page on the history of wedding soup
Recipe at foodnetwork.com

Italian soups
Italian-American cuisine
Cuisine of Campania
Wedding food